HMS Gaddesden was a Hunt class minesweeper of the Royal Navy ordered towards the end of World War I. She was commissioned in 1918 under Lieut. G. H. Hughes-Onslow for No.12 Fast Minesweeper Flotilla, on the River Clyde; she paid off in September 1919.

See also
Little Gaddesden, Hertfordshire

References
 

Hunt-class minesweepers (1916)
Royal Navy ship names
Ships built on the River Tyne
1917 ships